Lamotte's shrew (Crocidura lamottei) is a species of mammal in the family Soricidae. It is found in Benin, Burkina Faso, Cameroon, Ivory Coast, Gambia, Ghana, Guinea, Guinea-Bissau, Liberia, Mali, Nigeria, Senegal, Sierra Leone, and Togo. Its natural habitat is savanna.

References

Lamotte's shrew
Mammals of West Africa
Lamotte's shrew
Taxonomy articles created by Polbot
Taxa named by Henri Heim de Balsac